Gerrand is the surname of the following people:

Bill Gerrand (footballer, born 1916) (1916–2000), Australian rules footballer
Bill Gerrand (footballer, born 1941) (born 1941), Australian rules footballer
Ernest Walter Gerrand (1884–1970), Canadian politician in Saskatchewan
Rob Gerrand (born 1946), Australian writer of science fiction
Tess Gerrand (born 1988), Australian rower